Mogilyovka is a rural locality (a selo) in Gribovsky Selsoviet of Arkharinsky District, Amur Oblast, Russia. The population was 66 as of 2018. There are 3 streets.

Geography 
Mogilyovka is located on the left bank of the Arkhara River, 25 km east of Arkhara (the district's administrative centre) by road. Gribovka is the nearest rural locality.

References 

Rural localities in Arkharinsky District